Activating signal cointegrator 1 complex subunit 2 is a protein that in humans is encoded by the ASCC2 gene.

References

External links

Further reading